Mister Brazil (or Mister Brasil CNB, in Portuguese) is a male beauty contest held annually which aims to choose the best contestant to represent their country with honor in the traditional international Mister World contest. The Brazilian representatives began to be sent from the year 1996, with the paulista Thierre Garrito. Since 2007 who manages the sending of representatives to the international event is the team led by Henrique Fontes (Global Beauties Website director). The country has so far only an international title, obtained with the model Gustavo Gianetti in 2003.

Organization 
The event is Brazil's first large national beauty contest to include in its official activities evidence of talent, sports and fashion, in addition to encouraging the practice of philanthropic actions following its motto, Beauty with a Purpose.

Titleholders

Mister Brazil 
Color key

Mister Brazil for Mister World 
Note: Before 2007, another organization was the responsible for the Brazilian representatives in the competition. 
Color key

Mister Brazil for Mister International 
Color key

Mister Brazil for Manhunt International 
Color key

Mister Brazil for Mister Supranational 
Color key

Mister Brazil for Mister Global 
Color key

References

External links 

 Concurso Nacional de Beleza 

Brazil
Beauty pageants in Brazil
2001 establishments in Brazil
Brazilian awards
Mister Global by country